Strange Colours is a 2017 Australian film set in the opal-mining town of Lightning Ridge, New South Wales. It was shot with financial assistance from the Venice Biennale College Cinema fund and premiered at the 2017 Venice Biennale, subsequently screened at the 2018 Sydney Film Festival followed by other States.

Director was Russian-born Alena Lodkina; starring Kate Cheel, Daniel P. Jones and Justin Courtin.

Story 
A young woman Milena (Cheel) visits her estranged father Max (Jones), an opal miner who is in hospital, apparently dying.

The film has been released on DVD by Bonsai Films.

References

External links 
 

Australian independent films
2017 films
2017 drama films
2017 independent films
2010s English-language films
2010s Australian films